Ogoryltsevo is a rural locality (a village) in Mardengskoye Rural Settlement, Velikoustyugsky District, Vologda Oblast, Russia. The population was 13 as of 2002.

Geography 
Ogoryltsevo is located 14 km southwest of Veliky Ustyug (the district's administrative centre) by road. Torzhino is the nearest rural locality.

References 

Rural localities in Velikoustyugsky District